Jana Vadimovna Khokhlova (born 7 October 1985) is a Russian former competitive ice dancer. She is best known for her partnership with Sergei Novitski, with whom she is the 2008 World bronze medalist, 2009 European champion, and a two-time (2008–09) Russian national champion. She also competed with Andrei Maximishin and Fedor Andreev.

Career 
Khokhlova began her skating career with Aleko, a children's ice ballet based in Moscow. At the age of 13, she considered taking up pair skating but was too old to learn the jumps so a coach suggested she try ice dancing. Khokhlova initially competed with Andrei Maximishin.

Partnership with Sergei Novitski 
In October 2001, Khokhlova teamed up with Sergei Novitski, coached by Larisa Filina. Three months later, they finished seventh at the Russian Nationals. In 2003, they switched to the husband-and-wife coaching team of Alexander Svinin and Irina Zhuk. Khokhlova/Novitski trained mainly in Moscow's Sokolniki ice rink where ice time was limited, forcing them to move around to other rinks, however, the situation later improved.

In 2006, Khokhlova/Novitski qualified for the Olympics in Turin, Italy, finishing 12th. In autumn of 2006, they won their first Grand Prix series medals and qualified for the Grand Prix Final. They placed 4th at 2007 Europeans and 8th at Worlds. Their breakthrough came during the 2007-08 season. At 2007 Trophée Eric Bompard, Khokhlova/Novitski upset reigning European champions Isabel Delobel / Olivier Schoenfelder to win the free dance, although finishing second overall. They then claimed bronze at the 2008 Europeans. At 2008 Worlds, they were second after the original dance which combined with a fifth place in the free dance saw them finish in third overall and earn them a World medal.

During the 2008-09 season, Khokhlova/Novitski won gold at the European Championships but slipped to 6th at Worlds. The following season, they slipped further in the rankings, dropping to third at 2010 Europeans and 9th at the Olympics. They withdrew from Worlds due to Novitski's injury. He had lingering knee problems from a car accident in 2006 so they decided to split in April 2010.

Later career 
Khokhlova tried out with Lithuanian ice dancer Deividas Stagniūnas and Russian-Canadian singles skater Fedor Andreev. In May 2010, it was reported that Khokhlova would team up with Andreev, who had no previous competitive background in ice dance. Khokhlova / Andreev began training together in the second week of July, working on the ice 5–6 hours a day. They trained in Canton, Michigan with his mother Marina Zueva and Igor Shpilband.

Khokhlova / Andreev made their debut at the Golden Spin of Zagreb in December 2010, and went on to compete at 2011 Russian Nationals, finishing fifth in the short dance and third in the free dance for fourth place overall. In June 2011, Andreev injured his knee in a bad fall. In September 2011, it was reported that the partnership had ended due to Andreev's retirement.

Khokhlova coaches in Moscow and also participates in ice shows.

Programs

With Andreev

With Novitski

Competitive highlights

With Andreev

With Novitski

With Maximishin

References

External links 

 
 

1985 births
Living people
Russian female ice dancers
Figure skaters from Moscow
Figure skaters at the 2006 Winter Olympics
Figure skaters at the 2010 Winter Olympics
Olympic figure skaters of Russia
World Figure Skating Championships medalists
European Figure Skating Championships medalists
Universiade medalists in figure skating
Universiade gold medalists for Russia
Medalists at the 2003 Winter Universiade
Competitors at the 2005 Winter Universiade